Patricia Charbonneau (born April 19, 1959) is an American actress, perhaps best known for playing the part of Cay Rivvers in Desert Hearts, her first film role and for which she was nominated for the Independent Spirit Award for Best Female Lead.

Early life
Charbonneau was born in Valley Stream, New York on Long Island, the youngest of 10 children.  Her father, a retired businessman, is French; her mother is Austrian. She graduated in 1977 from Valley Stream Central High School, which she attended with fellow actors Steve Buscemi and Steve Hytner, as well as writer Ed Renehan. She later attended Boston University as a theater major, and left after a month to take a position with the Lexington Conservatory Theatre company in the Catskills.

Early work
In addition to work with the Lexington Conservatory Theatre, Charbonneau worked on the New York stage in a production of Revengers...A Tragedea, at Playwrights Horizons. She then became a member of the Actors Theatre of Louisville, where she originated the role of Lea in My Sister in this House, a part that she also played Off-Broadway.

Desert Hearts
In 1985, Charbonneau made her film debut in Donna Deitch's film Desert Hearts at a time when it was still considered a risk to portray a lesbian in a romantic drama - complete with a lengthy love scene. She told The Globe and Mail, "Kissing Helen wasn't the hard part, really. The hard part was walking out on the set naked and just standing there." Two days before shooting began, she found out that she was pregnant with her first child (by her rock musician husband Vincent Caggiano), whom she once called her "Desert Hearts baby."

For her performance in Desert Hearts, Charbonneau was nominated for a 1987 Independent Spirit Award for Best Female Lead.

Other notable work
In the following year she appeared in Michael Mann's Manhunter (based on the novel Red Dragon) and then played Anna, the lead, in Call Me (1988), which also featured fellow Valley Streamer Buscemi. The same year, she was featured in the crime drama/action movie Shakedown. Her television work began with a 1986 NBC pilot C.A.T. Squad and continued with dozens of appearances, including HBO's Tales from the Crypt, Crime Story, The Equalizer, Wiseguy, Murder She Wrote, Matlock, New York Undercover, and Law & Order: Criminal Intent. In the 1990 film RoboCop 2, she played the role of Linda Garcia. Despite the character's prominence in the movie's plot, her name is never spoken, and the role was not listed in the credits; observant fans were able to determine the character's name by noticing that she wore a name tag. In 1995, she starred in Mission Critical, a Legend Entertainment sci-fi adventure game. She played one of James Garner's daughters in the 1999 CBS made-for-TV film One Special Night, which featured Julie Andrews.

In March 2007, Charbonneau joined the faculty of the Hudson Valley Academy of Performing Arts in West Taghkanic, New York where she teaches an acting workshop for children and teens.

Personal life
Charbonneau met musician Vincent Caggiano in 1978, and they married in 1982. The couple have a daughter.

Filmography

Movies

Television

Video Games

References

External links
Patricia Charbonneau on Yahoo! Movies

Patricia Charbonneau article 1986 at People Magazine

Boston University College of Fine Arts alumni
American film actresses
American television actresses
American people of French descent
American people of Austrian descent
Valley Stream Central High School alumni
1959 births
Living people
People from Valley Stream, New York
21st-century American women